Aquarius is a 1969–1970 sculpture by Jerome Kirk, installed in Los Angeles's Bunker Hill neighborhood, in the U.S. state of California. The abstract, kinetic, stainless steel artwork is installed outside Union Bank Plaza. The Los Angeles Conservancy has described the work as a "fin-like metal mobile sculpture".

References

Abstract sculptures in California
Bunker Hill, Los Angeles
Kinetic sculptures in the United States
Outdoor sculptures in Greater Los Angeles
Stainless steel sculptures in the United States
Steel sculptures in California